Mohammad Salari is an Iranian reformist politician who currently serves as a member of the City Council of Tehran and head of its urban planning and architecture committee.

References
 Biography

1968 births
Living people
Islamic Iran Solidarity Party politicians
Tehran Councillors 2017–
Tehran Councillors 2013–2017
People from Sabzevar